Remember That may also refer to:

"Remember That" (Jessica Simpson song), 2008
"Remember That" (BtoB song), 2016
Remember That (EP), a 2016 EP by BtoB